John Shiers (1952–2011) was a Manchester based British left-wing gay rights campaigner. He was also a leading campaigner and a founding member of the Hulme Asbestos Action Group. He died in 2011 of mesothelioma a type of cancer closely linked to exposure to Asbestos. The legal case against his landlord citing asbestos in his council home leading to his cause of death was one of the first of this type.

Early life

In his earlier years he attended Lancaster University and was a member of the Gay Liberation Front there, travelling to London for Conferences. In 1978 an article he wrote was published by the Gay Left titled 'Two Steps Forward, Two Steps Back', 'Coming Out Six Years On by John Shiers'. On completing his studies at York University he was attracted to the lifestyle of the commercial gay scene at the emerging Manchester Gay Village at Canal Street. In 1978 he lamented on how it changed him, rather than him bringing change in accordance with the ideals he had learned from the Gay Liberation Front. He recalled bouts of depression and how for some time he met his partners through Cottaging, he described his sexual encounters as 'commoditised' and not associated with emotion, he was a member of the organisation 'Friend' at this time .

Career

In his early work career as a local authority officer he was a strong influence in decentralising council services in Manchester and Rochdale in the 1980s. His career in the early 1990s was with Save The Children where he became a consultant and charity trustee, he was influential in shaping services for children and young people in the North West England region. By the middle of the 1990s he had changed his career to psychosynthesis, to address further bouts of depression, he studied and qualified and went on to build a psychotherapy practice in Didsbury.

Campaigns

In the late 1970s he had moved to local authority housing in Hulme, owned by Manchester City Council when first arriving in the city.  Whilst living in Hulme he discovered he and thousands of his neighbours council properties were riddled with Asbestos. He had been one of the first to speak out about the asbestos in the properties. After his death Manchester Council admitted limited liability, in what was one of the first legal cases of this type. In 1988 he was instrumental in organising a demonstration against Section 28 in Manchester, attended by 25,000 people.

In 2011 he was a guest speaker at the Greater Manchester Asbestos Victims Support Group and spoke in the presence of a gathering including Members of parliament Lisa Nandy, Kate Green, Tony Lloyd and Paul Goggins alongside Dr Linda Waldman, co-author of a report on asbestos in social housing at the Action Mesothelioma Day of the need for greater access to information about asbestos in social housing, highlighting risks of no requirement for social housing landlords to inform tenants of the presence of asbestos.

References 

1952 births
2011 deaths
English LGBT rights activists
Asbestos
Environmental law
Product liability
English LGBT people
Deaths from cancer in England
Deaths from mesothelioma